Chaophraya Bodindechanuchit, personal name Mom Rajawongse Arun Chatrakul (14 April 1856 – 25 August 1921), was a Royal Siamese Army officer who served as Minister of War under King Vajiravudh from 1914 to 1921.

Biography
Mom Rajawongse Arun Chatrakul was born on 14 April 1856 and began military service in the royal guards in 1872 as a private assigned to the 6th Regiment and was promoted to private 1st class and then corporal of the 5th Regiment. In 1878, he transferred to an artillery regiment. On 9 April 1889, Arun became adjutant of the cadet school division while being promoted to captain. In 1892, he became commander of the cadet school, and on 4 October of the same year, was promoted to major. On 14 November, he was assigned as royal aide-de-camp, and on the 21st, he was granted the noble title of Luang Sorawiset Dechawut, with a sakdina of 800. On 20 September 1898, he was promoted to Phra Sorawiset Dechawut, with a sakdina of 1,000. In 1899, he became commandant of the army command division, Bangkok military province and on 15 August of the same year, he was promoted to lieutenant colonel.

In August 1900, he became the Royal Army yokkrabat (quartermaster) and on 21 September of the same year, his title was promoted to Phraya Phahonphonphayuhasena, with a sakdina of 1,500. On 3 April 1901, he was promoted to colonel, and on 11 August of the same year, he became adjutant of the Army. On 14 May 1902, Arun was promoted to major general. On 6 August 1903, he became Deputy Commander of the Department of War, and on 15 May, his title was promoted to Phraya Siharat Dechochai, the traditional title of the head of Krom Asa Yai Khwa, with a sakdina of 10,000. On 20 September 1906, he was promoted to lieutenant general.

In December 1910, he became Assistant Minister of War. On 22 January 1912, he was promoted to General. In 1912, Arun was granted the rank and title of Chaophraya Bodindechanuchit, with a sakdina of 10,000. On 4 February 1914, he was appointed acting Minister of War. On 1 April 1914, he became Minister of War. On 30 December 1917, he was promoted to field marshal.

He was a member of King Vajiravudh's paramilitary movement the Wild Tiger Corps, and received the rank of major in 1915.

Later years
Following a lengthy period of illness from lung disease, Chaophraya Bodindechanuchit died on 25 August 1921 at 14:35, at the age of 65.

He was granted a 15-day royally sponsored funeral, with the use of a kot (a funerary urn reserved for royalty and high-ranking nobles), by King Vajiravudh, who personally came to offer funeral water at 16:00 the next day.

Awards
Order of the White Elephant, 5th Class (1887)
Chakra Mala Medal (1893)
Haw Campaign Medal (1898)
Order of the White Elephant, 3rd Class (1901)
King Vajiravudh's Royal Cypher Medal, 3rd Class (1911)
Order of Chula Chom Klao, 1st Class (1912)
Ratana Varabhorn Order of Merit (1914)
King Vajiravudh's Royal Cypher Medal, 2nd Class
Dushdi Mala Medal (1919)
Order of the Nine Gems (1920)
Order of Rama, Second Class (1920)
King Vajiravudh's old courtiers' pin (1916)

Notes

References

1856 births
1921 deaths
Ministers of Defence of Thailand
Commanders-in-chief of the Royal Thai Army
Chaophraya
Field marshals of Thailand
Mom Rajawongse
19th-century Thai people